The Pachuca's Monumental Clock is a clock tower 40 m high, located in Plaza Independencia of the Historic centre of the city of Pachuca, in Hidalgo State, Mexico. Which was built between 1904 and 1910 to commemorate the Centennial of the Independence of Mexico. Its machinery is identical to that of Big Ben in London. The Monumental Clock is the best known symbol and representative of the city.

History

Background

On January 20, 1901, musical group known as the Banda de Rurales provides its first performance in a wooden bandstand in the Plaza de las Diligencias (now Plaza Independencia), directed by Candelario Rivas. The band gained popularity in the context of popular glory, a group of British mining companies proposing the governor Francisco Valenzuela, build a majestic tower of concerts, entrepreneurs were led by Alfonso María Brito. The project was approved until 1904, when she began her construction, but had to be suspended a year later for lack of funds.

In 1906, Governor Pedro L. Rodriguez returned the work, its design was by architect Tomás Cordero, and was built by engineers Francisco Hernández and Luis Carreón.

Construction

Francis Rule, a mining magnate originally from Cornwall, provided financing for the clock.
Construction began in 1906 with contributions from mining companies established in the region, the total cost amounted to approximately 300 thousand pesos oro, used in its construction quarry of Tezoantla town located in the municipality of Mineral del Monte.

The process used in the construction was tongue and groove based treatment technique that is quarried pierce each block with a cylindrical bore at the top and sculpt a kind of spike in the lower and the latter fits into the drilled without limestone use any material on the boards, 35 quarriers worked on the first stage and 29 in the second, among the latter Jacinto and Pedro Hernández Baldovino were charged with sculpting acroteria crowning the clock face. For the placement of carillon and copper dome, was requested to intervene and also alacateros of the mining company of San Rafael. 

Jesús Zenil collaborator of the minister plenipotentiary of Mexico in Austria-Hungary, purchased the machinery for the clock in England and sent it to Pachuca. He went to the factory founded by Edward John Dent and there discussed the acquisition clock and carillon that has a sound like that of its twin installed on the Big Ben, the machinery came to Pachuca years before the end of the construction of the tower and the installation was done by Tomás Zepeda. The clock was kept first in the Capilla de la Asunción, and later in the Casa de Francisco Rule until being installed in the tower.

The tower has open balconies, this was the place where the band would play, but it was a failed attempt as the height, the show could not be appreciated by people. The Banda de Rurales played at the kiosk attached to the tower again and finally ended the monument representing the Centennial of Mexican Independence. To complete the monument ordered a sheet of copper dome built in the Monterrey Iron Foundry Steel and opened in 1900. The piece was brought by rail and stood before the inauguration.

Opening

On September 15, 1910, shortly before 08:00 am, Alberto Dross, a German watchmaker verify the sound of bells and the accuracy of the hands of the four dials. At 12:00 pm, Gumersindo Meléndez put the finishing touches to the lighting of the plaza; About seven o'clock in the evening the plaza was completely obscured, at 21:00 the Rurales body arrival behind them came the great brass band.

At 21:15, Governor Ladislao Pedro Rodríguez, accompanied by his wife, Virginia Hernández, and various authorities, he made his entry into the plaza where he presided over the ceremony, that began with an overture played by the Banda de Rurales then the lawyer Joaquín González gave the official speech, an oratory on the meaning of Independence and the effort to build the great tower, which was followed by an interpretation of the band, immediately followed by the students in the public schools of Pachuca Hidalgo played the anthem again the Banda de Rurales executed a musical prelude to a poem by Miss Luz Conde, the band ended its involvement with the overture of the opera Tosca and closed the program with the poet Miguel Bracho his recitation of a poem.

It took his first strokes at 23:00 pm that day. The governor on the ground floor, to hear the first ringing pulled the curtain that hid the marble plaque testified to that opening, then rose to the first plant, of the discovered balconies, where he gave the cry of independence and the Mexican National Anthem.

Mr. Dross had arranged the machinery of the clock, so that for fifteen minutes, the ringing is constant, which is added the controlled explosion of dynamite charges that triggered mining companies in the hills surrounding the town, after the fires were which fireworks continued. During the early years, care of equipment and operation of the clock, was in charge of Mr. Alberto Dross.

Centennial 
On September 15, 2010, the clock turned 100 years of being built. Commemoration which was on par with the celebrations of the Bicentennial of Mexican independence. A ceremony where it talk about the historical and evolutionary portrait of the Monumental Clock in voice of Luis Corrales Vivar, director of the Casa de la Cultura de Pachuca, are counted with the participation of the Philharmonic Orchestra of Pachuca, it had the Centennial flag located on Elementary School Julián Villagrán and is the same national flag with which, were honored in laying the foundation stone of the Monumental Clock. 

The September 24 of 2010 was a light show and a concert by Ranchera music singer Pepe Aguilar, compared with 10 000 spectators, also unveiled a plaque commemorating the centennial. It also carried out art competition "100 Years, 100 watches" urban art exhibition by citizens of Pachuca the corridor is located at the street Río de las Avenidas. 

In 2011 it was declared a protected area by order of Pachuca City Council, published in the Official Gazette of the State of Hidalgo.

Architecture

Tower 

The tower is built of white stone quarry in neoclassical style. Each of its four faces pointing to the cardinals. The tower is composed of four sections or levels: 

 The first level, the lower is the smallest and has four doors, one on each side of rectangular vains, which provide access to the building.
 The second level is a frontispiece of Ionic order, which is accessed by a spiral staircase, is a space that overlooks the plaza through two separate balcony is on each side, which open arches would listen auditions of the Banda Rurales.
 The third level contains columns with Corinthian capital, in which houses the clock machinery, has light with four windows, one on each side, in which are four female statues.
 The fourth level, where the dial, each framed by an eagle with spread wings on the bottom and a semicircular cornice topped by an acroterion with the image of time, the whole is surmounted by a dome of copper and wrought iron, manufactured in Monterrey, in which three rectangular and one circular openings on each side allow the output of the sound of the bells housed there.

Female statue 

At the third level of the tower are in each of the faces, female statues 3m high, carved in Italy with Carrara marble. These represent Mexican historical moments until 1910, being these,1810 the beginning of the Independence of Mexico 1821 the consummation of the Independence of Mexico, 1857 enactment of the Federal Constitution of the United Mexican States 1859 the Law Reform.

Therefore, the statues representing the Liberty, Independence, Constitution and Reform: All of these dates are related to public rights and constitutional history, point which is reinforced by the image of each sculpture:
 The Independence (1810) is a young naked woman of upper torso with sword and torch in each hand.
 The Freedom (1821) also has the torso without coat, the right hand in up holding the bay laurel of victory, element that also takes by crown on the left wears a broken chain, left leg forward subtly and pleated tunic.
 The Constitution (1857) with grave, deep eyes, wearing a belt at the waist and holding in his hand the Magna Carta, his index finger of his right hand seems to point to the value of holding the left.
 The Reform (1859) in his right hand has a parchment unrolled and in left an open book covered with a robe, and wearing a skirt, it looks like progress because the folds the move of their clothes and his hair is wavy.

Clock 

The clock machinery is identical to that of the Big Ben in London, since it was built by the same factory in Austria before this factory was burned. The sound produced by giving the time clock is similar to the English. On the cover the Roman numeral IV is written IIII. In the fourth level the Monumental Clock, is a copper dome which houses eight different bells sounding in the key of "C Major" play every 15 minutes to the hour, to hour and quarter, to the hour and half, and hour and forty-five. At 6:00 pm the bells sing the National Anthem.

Lighting 

On January 16, 2011 was inaugurated the lighting, the project leaders were: Javier Villaseñor and Javier González, directors of lighting design and Santiago Bautista, who were in charge of installing the equipment. They used LED technology, to light up the four sides of the building, highlighting the dial, as well as sculptures. The LEDs reduce energy use 88% compared with traditional halogen lighting technology. The following was used for the illumination:

 60 LED projectors of different power and scope.
 40 m of LED strip.
 14 Digital controllers to communicate between all the equipment.
 1 digital memory to control all the effects, the Brain.

References 

Towers completed in 1910
Towers in Mexico
Clock towers
Monuments and memorials in Mexico
Buildings and structures in Hidalgo (state)
Pachuca
Tourist attractions in Hidalgo (state)